Aiki Segi (born 22 January 1991) is a Japanese professional footballer who plays as a midfielder for WE League club Omiya Ardija Ventus.

Club career 
Segi made her WE League debut on 12 September 2021.

References 

Living people
1991 births
Japanese women's footballers
Women's association football midfielders
Association football people from Ishikawa Prefecture
Omiya Ardija Ventus players
WE League players